Villarrasa is a town and municipality located in the province of Huelva, Spain. According to the 2005 census, it had a population of 2095 inhabitants and covers an area of   (29.1 people/km2).

References

External links
Villarrasa - Sistema de Información Multiterritorial de Andalucía

Municipalities in the Province of Huelva